A Gabbart is a type of lighter or  barge, used in the 17th through 19th century.  
They are a small one-masted sailing or coasting vessel. Used mostly  for inland navigation, especially on the River Clyde in Scotland. Transported mainly coal and fish (mainly herring).

Comment from 1877:  Gabbarts: Boats of from 30 to 40 tons, which, before the railway was opened to Balloch, carried coals etc., from the Clyde, up the River Leven, to various places on the banks of the Loch, taking back cargoes of slates or timber.  

Gabbart
The typical Scottish sailing barge, from which most Scottish Canal craft were developed. A long narrow flat vessel or lighter with a hatchway extending almost the full length of the decks, sometimes fitted with masts that may be lowered to pass under bridges' (Youngs Nautical Dictionary, 1863). Sloop rigged sailing craft, size 60 ft (ca. 18 m)  x 13 ft 6 inches, designed for the river Clyde.

See also
Clyde puffer

Ship types
Scottish design
Ships of Scotland
17th century in Scotland
18th century in Scotland
19th century in Scotland
Sailing in Scotland
Coal in Scotland